William Duncan (19 October 1912 – 27 July 1943) was an Australian cricketer. He played in one first-class match for Queensland in 1930/31.

See also
 List of Queensland first-class cricketers

References

External links
 

1912 births
1943 deaths
Australian cricketers
Queensland cricketers
Cricketers from Brisbane